The Jaguar Land Rover car platforms are the major structures, designed by Jaguar Land Rover (JLR), which underpin their Jaguar and Land Rover cars.

Current platforms 
The following platforms are used by JLR in its current car ranges.

D2a 
The D2a is the aluminium alloy platform used on the Jaguar XJ (X351).

D6a 
The D6a is an all-aluminium platform developed from the XK platform for use on the Jaguar F-Type. David Brown Automotive also uses the XK platform for their Speedback Aston Martin DB series-inspired sports car.

D7 
The D7 platform was developed as the Premium Lightweight Architecture (PLA) aluminium platform for larger vehicles. There are four variants of the D7: the D7a (also known as the iQ[Al]) used by the Jaguar XE (X760), Jaguar XF (X260), Jaguar F-Pace (X761) and Land Rover Range Rover Velar (L560); the D7e for the Jaguar I-Pace, the D7u used by the Land Rover Discovery (L462), Land Rover Range Rover Sport (L494) and Land Rover Range Rover (L405) and the D7x developed for the 2020 Land Rover Defender (L663).

D8 
The D8 (also known as the LR-MS) steel platform is a heavily modified platform based on the Ford EUCD platform, a platform inherited when Land Rover was a subsidiary of Ford. It is used for the Land Rover Discovery Sport, Land Rover Range Rover Evoque (L538), Tata Safari, and Tata Harrier.

PTA 
The PTA (Premium Transverse Architecture) is a development of the D8 platform which can be used for mild-hybrid, electrified and ICE powertrains. It was first used on the Jaguar E-Pace and then on the second generation Range Rover Evoque and second generation Land Rover Discovery Sport.

MLA 
The MLA (Modular Longitudinal Architecture) is an electric platform designed to be used for all-electric drive, plug-in hybrid and mild hybrid vehicles. On 5 July 2019, JLR announced that  the upcoming electric Jaguar XJ was to be manufactured on this platform at Castle Bromwich site after retooling of the plant. The Jaguar J-Pace large SUV was also planned to use the MLA platform, along with a Land Rover model.  However, the XJ and J-Pace were cancelled in February 2021. On 26 October 2021, JLR revealed the fifth generation Range Rover which uses the MLA-Flex platform.

Summary table

References 

Car platforms
platforms